The 2013 Monza GP2 Series round was a GP2 Series motor race held on September 7 and 8, 2013 at Autodromo Nazionale Monza, Italy. It was the ninth round of the 2013 GP2 Series. The race supported the 2013 Italian Grand Prix.

Classification

Qualifying

Feature race

Sprint race

See also 
 2013 Italian Grand Prix
 2013 Monza GP3 Series round

References

Monza
Monza GP2